Oak Flat may refer to:
Oak Flat (Arizona)
Oak Flat, California
Oak Flat, West Virginia
Oak Flat: A Fight for Sacred Land in the American West, a 2020 book by Lauren Redniss

See also
Oak Flats, New South Wales